Chugachik Island is a small island in the upper reaches of Kachemak Bay, an indent in the Kenai Peninsula of south-central Alaska.  The island falls within the bounds of Kachemak Bay State Park.

The island is of archaeological interest, with at least two sites (identified as SEL-033 and SEL-079) that have been professionally excavated.  SEL-033 is a predominantly a midden, in which remains of flora and fauna have been recovered among human artifacts, including stone and bone tools, and a cradle made of birch bark.  The site was excavated in 1974 and 1977, with radiocarbon dating suggesting occupation around 360 BCE. SEL-079, excavated in 1982, included three layers of occupation, dating from the early 1st century BCE to a Tanaina occupation estimated to date to the late 19th century.  The latter find represents the first known evidence of Tanaina occupation of the area.  A parcel of  surrounding SEL-033 was listed on the National Register of Historic Places in 1976.

See also
List of islands of Alaska
National Register of Historic Places listings in Kenai Peninsula Borough, Alaska

References

Islands of Alaska
Islands of Kenai Peninsula Borough, Alaska
Archaeological sites on the National Register of Historic Places in Alaska
National Register of Historic Places in Kenai Peninsula Borough, Alaska